Jean-Kersley Gardenne (born 16 February 1972) is a retired Mauritian pole vaulter.

His personal best jump is 5.50 metres, achieved in June 1996 in Dreux. This is the Mauritian record. He did however have a better indoor mark with 5.60 metres, achieved in January 1998 in Liévin.

Achievements

References

External links
 

1972 births
Living people
Mauritian male pole vaulters
Athletes (track and field) at the 1992 Summer Olympics
Athletes (track and field) at the 1996 Summer Olympics
Olympic athletes of Mauritius
Athletes (track and field) at the 1998 Commonwealth Games
Commonwealth Games bronze medallists for Mauritius
Commonwealth Games medallists in athletics
African Games silver medalists for Mauritius
African Games medalists in athletics (track and field)
African Games bronze medalists for Mauritius
Athletes (track and field) at the 1991 All-Africa Games
Athletes (track and field) at the 1995 All-Africa Games
20th-century Mauritian people
Medallists at the 1998 Commonwealth Games